Earl LeRoy "Buddy" Carter  (born September 6, 1957) is an American pharmacist and politician serving as the U.S. representative for Georgia's 1st congressional district since 2015. The district is based in Savannah and includes most of the state's coastal southern portion. A member of the Republican Party, Carter served as a Georgia state representative (2005–2009) and Georgia state senator (2009–2014).

Early life and education
Carter graduated in 1975 from Robert W. Groves High School in Garden City, Georgia. He earned an associate degree from Young Harris College in 1977 and a Bachelor of Science in pharmacy from the University of Georgia in 1980.

Political career
Carter served on the planning and zoning commission for the city of Pooler from 1989 to 1993 and on Pooler's city council from 1994 to 1995. He served as Pooler's mayor from 1996 to 2004. Carter was first elected to the state legislature in 2005, serving two terms in the Georgia House of Representatives from 2006 to 2010. He was elected to the Georgia Senate in 2009. He sat on the Senate Appropriations, Health and Human Services, Higher Education, and Public Safety committees.

In March 2014, a controversy emerged regarding S.B. 408, a bill authored by Carter that would increase reimbursement rates for pharmacies in Georgia. As he is the owner of three pharmacies that would see increased profits as a result of the bill, many considered his vote in violation of the Senate's ethical guidelines. "Obviously, it's borderline," he admitted.

Carter gave up his state senate seat in 2014 to run for Congress after 22-year incumbent Jack Kingston announced he was running for the United States Senate. He finished first in the six-way Republican primary–the real contest in this heavily Republican district–with 36% of the vote, well short of the 51% required for outright victory. He then defeated Bob Johnson in the runoff with 53% of the vote. In the general election, he defeated the Democratic nominee, Brian Reese, with 60.9% of the vote, carrying all but two counties in the district. In 2016, he was unopposed in both the primary and general elections, and took over 99% of the vote against a write-in candidate.

Carter was reelected again in 2018 and 2020. The Democratic challengers both years were the first since 1992 to clear 40% of the vote in the district.

Political positions

2020 presidential election 
On January 6, 2021, in a vote held after protestors stormed the U.S. Capitol, Carter voted against certifying the 2020 presidential election despite no evidence of widespread election fraud, a vote he has continued to defend, saying it "will be a cold day in hell" before he apologizes for it.

Drug policy 
The marijuana legalization advocacy organization NORML has rated Carter a "D".

Carter voted against the Veterans Equal Access Amendment in 2015 and 2016 (which would expand access to medical marijuana for veterans), against the McClintock/Polis Amendment in 2015 (which would prevent the Department of Justice from prosecuting federal marijuana offenses that are legal in the state) and against the Rohrabacher/Farr Amendment in 2015 (which would prevent federal officials from interfering with a state's medical marijuana program).

In 2017, Carter renewed his push to drug-test people who receive unemployment insurance.

Carter is against cannabis legalization. He has called it "nothing more than a gateway drug". On April 1, 2022, Carter voted against the MORE Act, which would have decriminalized cannabis at the federal level, allowing states to set their own policies.

Health care

Carter supports the repeal of the Affordable Care Act (ACA). He has said that there is no circumstance that would induce him to vote in favor of keeping the ACA, including if most of his constituents were in favor of it.

On July 26, 2017, Carter was asked during a live television interview if he supported Trump's criticism of U.S. Senator Lisa Murkowski for her opposition to the procedural vote to begin the Senate's healthcare debate. Carter said he did, adding, "Somebody needs to go over there to that Senate and snatch a knot in their ass." The incident prompted widespread media coverage.

Tax reform 

Carter voted for the Tax Cuts and Jobs Act of 2017, saying he believed it would make businesses in his district more competitive in a global market. He also said it would help his constituents earn and/or save more money.

Immigration

Carter co-sponsored a bill that would let illegal immigrants serve in the U.S. military in exchange for legal residency.

Carter supported Trump's 2017 executive order to temporarily curtail immigration from seven countries until better screening methods are devised. He said, "While I believe there needs to be thoughtful clarifications on the executive actions similar to Secretary Kelly’s announcement about lawful permanent residents, the number one priority of the federal government is to provide for the common defense."

Carter wants to prohibit all federal funding from sanctuary cities in Georgia (sanctuary cities prohibit city officials from asking about a person's immigration status when they report an unrelated crime). He also said he would like to test the huge backlog of rape kits in Georgia, except in sanctuary cities.

Abortion 
Carter opposes abortion. He cosponsored the Sanctity of Human Life Act (H.R. 586), which would make all abortions illegal.

H.R. 586 provides a constitutional right to life to embryos at the moment of fertilization. A similar bill in the Senate, S. 231, claims to not target women who use birth control, women who suffer from miscarriages, or families that want to conceive using vitro fertilization, but the House bill contains no such exceptions. When asked by a constituent during a town hall in Savannah whether he had concerns about restricting access to birth control when rape is so common on college campuses, Carter replied, "I'm not going to vote for any bill that endorses abortion." H.R. 586, which would ban abortion, contains no exceptions for the life or health of the mother or cases of rape or incest.

Education

When asked during a February 2017 town hall in Savannah whether religious doctrine should be taught in public school science classes, Carter responded, "I have always thought we should teach the Bible in school."

LGBT rights
Carter has claimed that same-sex marriage should be illegal.

During an August 2017 town hall in Brunswick, Carter said he supported a ban on transgender people serving in the military, saying, "I don't want 'em serving in the military. I'm sorry."

Gun rights 

Carter is a strong supporter of gun rights, and has an "A" rating from the National Rifle Association for his stances on gun issues.

In February 2018, during a town hall in Hinesville, when asked about mass shootings in America, Carter told attendees to not look to Congress for answers about gun violence, saying Congress is not responsible for gun violence in America.

Texas v. Pennsylvania
In December 2020, Carter was one of 126 Republican members of the House of Representatives to sign an amicus brief in support of Texas v. Pennsylvania, a lawsuit filed at the United States Supreme Court contesting the results of the 2020 presidential election, in which Joe Biden defeated Trump. The Supreme Court declined to hear the case on the basis that Texas lacked standing under Article III of the Constitution to challenge the results of an election held by another state. House Speaker Nancy Pelosi issued a statement that called signing the amicus brief an act of "election subversion."

U.S. House of Representatives

Committee assignments
Committee on Energy and Commerce
Subcommittee on Communications and Technology
Subcommittee on Environment and Climate Change
Subcommittee on Health
Committee on the Budget
Select Committee on the Climate Crisis

Caucus memberships
 House Baltic Caucus
 United States Congressional International Conservation Caucus
U.S.-Japan Caucus
Republican Study Committee

Electoral history

References

External links

 Congressman Buddy Carter official U.S. House website
 Buddy Carter for Congress
 
 
 

|-

1957 births
21st-century American politicians
American pharmacists
Georgia (U.S. state) city council members
Republican Party Georgia (U.S. state) state senators
Living people
Mayors of places in Georgia (U.S. state)
Republican Party members of the Georgia House of Representatives
People from Chatham County, Georgia
Pharmacists from Georgia (U.S. state)
Republican Party members of the United States House of Representatives from Georgia (U.S. state)
University of Georgia alumni
Young Harris College alumni
American gun rights activists